Sanford's white-eye (Zosterops lacertosus) is a species of bird in the family Zosteropidae. It is endemic to Nendo Island.

Its natural habitat is subtropical or tropical moist lowland forest. It is threatened by habitat loss. This species has a small population due to it being endemic to Nendo Island. This population seems to be declining because of their near threatened status since their habitat is being targeted for commercial purposes.

It is named after Leonard Cutler Sanford, a trustee of the American Museum of Natural History.

References

Sanford's white-eye
Birds of the Santa Cruz Islands
Endemic fauna of the Solomon Islands
Sanford's white-eye
Taxonomy articles created by Polbot
Endemic birds of the Solomon Islands